Raymond Ghajar is a Lebanese politician. He served as Minister of Energy and Water in the cabinet of Hassan Diab from 21 January 2020 to 10 September 2021. On 10 August 2020, the entire cabinet resigned and will serve in a caretaker capacity until a new government is formed.

References

Living people
Year of birth missing (living people)
Place of birth missing (living people)
Government ministers of Lebanon

Free Patriotic Movement politicians
Lebanese Maronites